Undamma Bottu Pedata is a 1968 Indian Telugu-language supernatural drama film directed by K. Viswanath and produced by Adurthi Subba Rao who also wrote the screenplay. It is a Telugu adaptation of Datta Dharmadhikari's 1967 Marathi film Thamb Laxmi Kunku Lavte.

Premise
The film revolves around the efforts taken by Lakshmi (Jamuna) to maintain prosperity in her husband's (Krishna) house. Undamma Bottu Pedata was released on 28 September 1968, received widely positive reviews and became successful.

Cast 
Adapted from The Hindu:
 Krishna as Krishna
 Jamuna as Lakshmi
 V. Nagayya as Dasaratharamaiah
 Dhulipala as Haridasu
 Nagabhushanam as Srinivasulu
 Chalam as Anjaneyulu
 Sakshi Ranga Rao as the postmaster
 Arja Janardhana Rao as Venkateswarlu
 Sowcar Janaki as Tulasamma
 Anjali Devi as the goddess Lakshmi
 Suryakantham as Papayamma
 Suryakala as Seshu
 Meenakumari as Sumathi

Production 
Adurthi Subba Rao bought the Telugu remake rights of the Marathi film Thamb Laxmi Kunku Lavte (1967). While writing the screenplay of the remake, titled Undamma Bottu Pedata, he retained the essence of the original's story with its climax, but made many other changes such as introducing new characters, mainly to suit the interests of Telugu-speaking audiences. Subba Rao also intended to direct the film and produce it under his banner Babu Movies, but the success of his Hindi directorial venture Milan (1967) led to him receiving more directorial offers from Hindi film producers; after accepting to direct Man Ka Meet (1969) for Sunil Dutt's Ajanta Arts, he entrusted his protégé K. Viswanath with directing Undamma Bottu Pedata. The dialogues were written by N. R. Nandi, cinematography was handled by K. S. Ramakrishna and editing by Kotagiri Gopala Rao.

Soundtrack 
The soundtrack was composed by K. V. Mahadevan, with lyrics written by Devulapalli Krishnasastri.

Release and reception 
Undamma Bottu Pedata was released on 28 September 1968, successfully completing 62-day run in Vijayawada.

References

External links 

1960s Telugu-language films
1968 drama films
1968 films
Films directed by K. Viswanath
Paranormal films
Supernatural fiction
Indian romantic drama films
Indian family films
Films shot in Andhra Pradesh
Films set in Andhra Pradesh
Films set in Konaseema
Films scored by K. V. Mahadevan
Indian black-and-white films
Indian drama films
Telugu remakes of Marathi films